Ursula Hilda Mary Martin  (born 3 August 1953) is a British computer scientist, with research interests in theoretical computer science and formal methods. She is also known for her activities aimed at encouraging women in the fields of computing and mathematics. Since 2019, she has served as a professor at the School of Informatics, University of Edinburgh.

From 20142018, Martin was a Professor of Computer Science in the Department of Computer Science at the University of Oxford, and holds an EPSRC Established Career Fellowship. Prior to this she held a chair of Computer Science in the School of Electronic Engineering and Computer Science at Queen Mary, University of London, where she was Vice-Principal of Science and Engineering, 20052009.

Education
Martin was born in London on 3 August 1953 to Anne Louise (née Priestman) and Captain Geoffrey Richard Martin. She was educated at Abbey College at Malvern Wells. In 1975 she graduated with an MA from Girton College, Cambridge, and in 1979 with a PhD from the University of Warwick, both in mathematics.

Career and research
Martin began in mathematics working in group theory, later moving into string rewriting systems. She has held academic posts at University of Illinois at Urbana-Champaign, the University of Manchester and Royal Holloway, University of London. She has made sabbatical visits to Massachusetts Institute of Technology and SRI International (Menlo Park). In 2004 she was a visiting fellow at the Oxford Internet Institute.

From 1992 to 2002, Martin was Professor of Computer Science at the University of St Andrews in Scotland. She was the first female professor at the University since its foundation in 1411.

From 2003 to 2005, Martin was seconded to the University of Cambridge Computer Laboratory part-time and served as the director of the Women@CL project to lead local, national and international initiatives for women in computing, supported by Microsoft Research and Intel Cambridge Research. She was a Fellow of Newnham College, Cambridge.

Martin has served as an advisory editor for the Annals of Pure and Applied Logic journal (published by Elsevier) and on the editorial boards for The Journal of Computation and Mathematics (London Mathematical Society) and Formal Aspects of Computing (Springer-Verlag).

Publications
Her publications include
 with Christopher Hollings and Adrian Rice, Ada Lovelace: The Making of a Computer Scientist, Bodleian Library, 2018, 114 pp.

Honours and awards
Martin was appointed Commander of the Order of the British Empire (CBE) in the 2012 New Year Honours for services to computer science. In 2017 she was elected a Fellow of the Royal Society of Edinburgh (FRSE) and the Royal Academy of Engineering (FREng).

References

1953 births
Living people
Alumni of Girton College, Cambridge
Alumni of the University of Warwick
British computer scientists
Formal methods people
University of Illinois Urbana-Champaign faculty
Academics of the University of Manchester
Academics of Royal Holloway, University of London
Academics of the University of St Andrews
Fellows of Newnham College, Cambridge
Fellows of the Royal Academy of Engineering
Female Fellows of the Royal Academy of Engineering
Academics of Queen Mary University of London
Members of the Department of Computer Science, University of Oxford
Academic journal editors
British women computer scientists
Commanders of the Order of the British Empire
Fellows of the Royal Society of Edinburgh
21st-century women engineers